Cautethia spuria, the spurious sphinx, is a moth of the family Sphingidae. The species was first described by Jean Baptiste Boisduval in 1875. It lives from Mexico to Costa Rica to southern Texas and Oklahoma on the North American continent.

References

External links

Cautethia spuria Sphingidae of the Americas

Cautethia
Moths described in 1875
Sphingidae of South America
Moths of South America